Dan Rafael (born August 25, 1970) is an American sportswriter known for his coverage of boxing and baseball.

Early life and education
Rafael was born in Albany, New York. He attended Binghamton University, where he wrote for the school paper. He started as sports writer, and worked his way to managing editor. He also served an internship at the local newspaper, the Press & Sun-Bulletin.

Career

Baseball 
Rafael later took a part-time job at The Saratogian, a community newspaper published at Saratoga Springs, New York. When a full-time job opened at the newspaper, he took it, then moved to a reporting position at the Press & Sun-Bulletin, covering college sports and local auto-racing. He later was assigned to cover the Binghamton Mets,.

Gannett (which owned the Binghamton newspaper) fostered promising writers by detailing them to Virginia for four months and thoroughly grounding them in the newspaper business, working at USA Today. Rafael began his course in August 1998. He worked covering major-league baseball. When baseball season ended, the newspaper's principal boxing reporter (Jon Saraceno) was moving up, so Rafael was asked to cover boxing.

Rafael's temporary duty at USA Today ended in December 1998, and he returned to Binghamton.

Boxing 
In January 2000, he was asked to return to USA Today on a permanent basis, as a boxing writer.

ESPN Boxing 
In September 2004, ESPN began pursuing Rafael, desiring to strengthen its boxing coverage. He began with ESPN.com in March 2005. He writes in-depth coverage pieces, and his specialty is his weekly compilation of rankings.

In January 2016, ESPN announced Rafael had been signed to a new multi-year agreement.

World Boxing News 
Rafael joined World Boxing News in May 2021 following discussions with WBN Editor Phil Jay.
Rafael left WBN in early 2022. He joined Big Fight Weekend, a boxing podcast, in April 2022.

Awards and recognition
 In 2013 Rafael was awarded the Nat Fleischer Award for Excellence in Boxing Journalism from the Boxing Writers Association of America.
 Dead Spin's Iron Mike Gallego recognized Dan Rafael as "The Most Important Journalist in Boxing".

References

External links
Official Blog
Twitter Page
Facebook Page

Boxing writers
Living people
ESPN people
American male journalists
1970 births
Writers from Albany, New York
Binghamton University alumni